Last (stylized as LAST) is the 5th full album released by Japanese band Uverworld as well as the follow-up to their fourth album, Awakeve. It was released on April 14, 2010 under gr8! records label. A limited pressing of the album was also released on the same day which includes a DVD containing music videos of 99/100 Damashi no Tetsu (99/100騙しの哲?), Go-On and Kanashimi wa Kitto (哀しみはきっと?) as well as a video of the filming process for their 3 music videos and a bonus clip "Special Track 09.12.25: Turn Around with Gold" which is a Gold special video.

The album was one of the highly anticipated album and was ranked #2 at the Ninki Chart and was charted at #2 for Oricon Weekly Ranking.

The title means the present time's highest, newest and the ultimate album.

Track listing

Personnel 
Takuya∞  – vocals, rap, programming
Katsuya  – guitar
Akira    – guitar, programming
Nobuto   – bass guitar
Shintarō – drums

References

External links 
 uverworld.com

2010 albums
Uverworld albums
Gr8! Records albums
Japanese-language albums